Mahfujur Rahman may refer to:

 Mahfujur Rahman- (born 3 September 1973) is a Bangladeshi cricket umpire.;
 Mahfuzur Rahman Khan- is a Bangladeshi cinematographer.
 Mahfuzur Rahaman- is a Bangladesh Awami League politician and the incumbent Member of Parliament from Chittagong-3.
 Mohammad Mahfizur Rahman- is a Bangladeshi swimmer.